The State Convention of Baptist in Ohio (SCBO) is a group of churches affiliated with the Southern Baptist Convention located in the U.S. state of Ohio. Headquartered in Columbus, Ohio, the convention is made up of 16 Baptist associations and around 725 churches as of 2010.

Affiliated Organizations 
Ohio Baptist Foundation
Ohio Baptist Messenger
Metro-Columbus Bible Institute
Seneca Lake Baptist Assembly

References

External links
State Convention of Baptist in Ohio official website

Baptist Christianity in Ohio
Conventions associated with the Southern Baptist Convention